Emin Quliyev (born 12 April 1977) is a former Azerbaijani football player and now a coach.

Honours
"Kapaz" Ganja
Azerbaijan Cup: 1999–2000,
Neftchi Baku
Azerbaijan Premier League: 2003–04
Azerbaijan Cup: 2003–04
Khazar Lankaran
Azerbaijan Premier League: 2006–07
Azerbaijan Cup: 2006–07, 2007–08
CIS Cup: 2008

National team statistics

International goals

Managerial statistics

External links

Player profile

1977 births
Living people
Azerbaijani footballers
Azerbaijan international footballers
Azerbaijani expatriate footballers
Azerbaijani football managers
FC Baku players
PFC Litex Lovech players
PFC Cherno More Varna players
FC Spartak Vladikavkaz players
Khazar Lankaran FK players
Simurq PIK players
Russian Premier League players
First Professional Football League (Bulgaria) players
Azerbaijan Premier League players
Khazar Lankaran FK managers
Association football midfielders
Neftçi PFK players
Ravan Baku FK managers